Anište is a fortress in Serbia. It is located east from confluence of Ljig into Kolubara. Today, only small underground remains are left.

See also 
 List of fortifications in Serbia

References 

Forts in Serbia
Medieval sites in Serbia
Lazarevac